Ginevra Bay is the inner part of Storfjorden, Svalbard, between Barentsøya and Spitsbergen. It is named after James Lamont's vessel Ginevra.

References

Fjords of Svalbard
Barentsøya
Landforms of Spitsbergen